Isaac Pigeon Walker (November 2, 1815March 29, 1872) was an American politician who served as a U.S. Senator from Wisconsin.

Walker was born in Virginia and moved with his family to Illinois in 1825. He practiced law in Springfield, Illinois, and served one term in the Illinois House of Representatives. He moved to Wisconsin in 1841 and practiced law in the Milwaukee area. He served in Wisconsin's territorial legislature from 1847 to 1848. When Wisconsin was admitted as a state in 1848, Walker was elected as a Democrat to represent Wisconsin in the United States Senate, where he served until 1855.

Walker opposed slavery. In 1850, he tried to introduce a one-sentence amendment to Henry Clay's omnibus bill. The amendment proposed to abolish peon slavery, a form of unfree labor among Native American workers in California and New Mexico.

He is buried at Forest Home Cemetery in Milwaukee.

Isaac Walker's older brother, George H. Walker, was a founder and mayor of Milwaukee, Wisconsin.

References

Notes

1815 births
1872 deaths
Members of the Wisconsin Territorial Legislature
Members of the Illinois House of Representatives
Illinois lawyers
Wisconsin lawyers
Politicians from Wheeling, West Virginia
Politicians from Springfield, Illinois
Wisconsin Democrats
Democratic Party United States senators from Wisconsin
19th-century American politicians
Lawyers from Wheeling, West Virginia
19th-century American lawyers